El Ghouri Mosque was a Tunisian mosque located on El Haddanine Street in the Medina of Tunis.
It does not exist anymore.

Etymology
It was named after the saint Cheikh Abi Yahia Ben Abi Baker El Ghouri El Safakisi, a wise Jurisconsult who lived in the 8th century.

References

Mosques in Tunis